Stenotaphrum is a widespread genus of plants in the grass family.

The name is derived from the Greek words στενός (stenos), meaning "narrow", and τάϕρος (taphros), meaning "trench." It refers to cavities in the raceme axis.

 Species
 Stenotaphrum clavigerum Stapf – Aldabra Island and Assumption Island (both parts of Seychelles)
 Stenotaphrum dimidiatum (L.) Brongn. – Pembagrass – Tanzania, Mozambique, South Africa, Madagascar + other Indian Ocean islands, Indian Subcontinent, Myanmar, Thailand, Pen Malaysia
 Stenotaphrum helferi Munro ex Hook.f. – Myanmar, Thailand, Pen Malaysia, Vietnam, Philippines, Fujian, Guangdong, Hainan, Yunnan
 Stenotaphrum micranthum (Desv.) C.E.Hubb – Tanzania, Queensland; various islands of Indian + Pacific Oceans + South China Sea
 Stenotaphrum oostachyum Baker – Madagascar
 Stenotaphrum secundatum (Walter) Kuntze – St. Augustine grass, Charleston grass, "buffalo grass" – Americas from Virginia + California to Uruguay
 Stenotaphrum unilaterale Baker – Madagascar

 formerly included
see Parapholis 
 Stenotaphrum compressum – Parapholis filiformis

References

External links 

 Grassbase – The World Online Grass Flora

Panicoideae
Grasses of Africa
Grasses of Asia
Poaceae genera